Sphaenolobium is a genus of flowering plants belonging to the family Apiaceae.

Its native range is Central Asia.

Species:

Sphaenolobium korovinii 
Sphaenolobium tenuisectum 
Sphaenolobium tianschanicum

References

Apioideae